Jamides lugine is a butterfly of the lycaenids or blues family. It is found on Borneo and in Myanmar.

References

 (1895). A monograph of the Bornean Lycaenidae, Proceedings of the Zoological Society of London. 1895:556-567, 4 pls.
 (1992). A generic classification of the tribe Polyommatini of the Oriental and Australian regions (Lepidoptera, Lycaenidae, Polyommatinae). Bulletin of the University of Osaka Prefecture, Series B, Vol. 44, Suppl.

Butterflies described in 1895
Jamides
Butterflies of Borneo